Heterocrossa philpotti is a moth of the family Carposinidae. It is endemic to New Zealand. The subspecies H. philpotti hudsoni has been recorded as being observed in Albany, Auckland. Alan W. Emmerson and Robert J.B. Hoare have hypothesised that there may be two species confused within this name.

Subspecies
Heterocrossa philpotti philpotti (Dugdale, 1971) (Auckland, Adams Island, Enderby Island, Ocean Island, Rose Islands)
Heterocrossa philpotti hudsoni Dugdale, 1988

References

External links
Holotype specimen of Heterocrossa philpotti philpotti held at Te Papa.

Carposinidae
Moths of New Zealand
Moths described in 1971
Endemic fauna of New Zealand
Endemic moths of New Zealand